Vancouver Technical Secondary School, often referred to as Van Tech, is a public secondary school  located on the East Side of Vancouver, British Columbia, Canada. Vancouver Technical currently offers Advanced Placement, Summit, Flex Humanities, and French Immersion programs.

History
Vancouver Technical School opened in September 1916 as a boys-only school and was located in the basement of King Edward Highschool on 12th and Oak. It was the province's first vocational school and was led by J. George Lister, who would later be called the "Founder of Technical Education in BC. The school then moved to the Labour Temple, located on the corner of Homer and Dusmuir.

As enrollment grew, plans were developed for a modern technical school along Broadway. The building was designed by architects Townley and Matheson to include large technical shops, laboratories, cafeteria, auditorium, gymnasium, and swimming pool. However, the swimming pool was never completed due to lack of funds. The school moved to the new building in 1928, where it is located to this day. Girls were admitted into the school starting in 1940 and were given their own wing on the East side.

Major seismic upgrades to the school's five buildings began in 2005 and was completed in 2008 at a cost of $40 million. The seismic upgrades reduced the available floorspace, leading to the relocation of classroom and workshops. Classrooms and workshops were relocated or replaced during the upgrade as there was less floor space available. this reduced the school's capacity from 2,100 students to 1,700. The auditorium's interior was also renovated during the upgrade, with the funds being raised by students' parents.

One of the school's founders (and principal from 1930 until 1944), James George Sinclair, is also the great-grandfather of 23rd Canadian Prime Minister Justin Trudeau.

Mini Schools
Vancouver Technical offers a wide range of mini school programs.

Summit is a five-year mini school program as of 2018, which focuses on enriching the four academic courses: Math, Science, Social Studies and English. The Summit program offers accelerated sciences and mathematics, with students completing Chemistry 11 and Pre-Calculus 11 in grade 10. Students in the Summit program engage in many extra-curricular activities including a three-day camp at the beginning of the school year, and opportunities to travel to Europe.

Flex Humanities is a mini-school that integrates Philosophy, World Literature, History, Fine Arts, Film and Media Studies, and Integrated Arts and Technology from grades 8 – 12.  In grade 12, the students have the opportunity to participate in a major culminative field study; in past years, this trip has involved Quebec City/Montreal or New York.

Facilities 
With its seismic upgrade from 2005 - 2008, many classrooms were moved around and their 500 wing was demolished. With this, Vancouver Technical was a recipient to a $1,000,000 artificial turf field that was approved in 2006. Tennis courts were built off Slocan St. and Vancouver Technical is set to receive Vancouver's first regulation Track and Field Training Facility.

Notable alumni
Greg Joy, Olympic medalist - track and field
Sam Sullivan, former mayor of the city of Vancouver, former MLA for Vancouver False Creek
Bowinn Ma, MLA for North Vancouver-Lonsdale
John Ferguson (1938–2007), NHL player/coach
Dean Malkoc, NHL player for the Vancouver Canucks, Boston Bruins, and New York Islanders
Julia Grosso, Soccer player for Canadian women's national team and 2020 Olympic Gold Medallist

Popular culture
Exterior shots of the school were used in the CW's television series Smallville to represent Smallville High School, Clark Kent's alma mater during adolescence. The school was also used as a filming location in Scary Movie, Paycheck, Supernatural, iZombie, Psych, Supergirl, The Killing, and She's the Man starring Amanda Bynes and Channing Tatum.

References

External links
Vancouver Technical Secondary School
Vancouver School Board - Vancouver Technical Secondary
Van Tech students playing Spanish Fever
Van Tech Music Program

High schools in Vancouver
Educational institutions established in 1916
1916 establishments in British Columbia